Birch Mountain Airport  is a remote forest fire fighting airfield in northeastern Alberta, Canada. "Birch Mountain" is just the name of the airfield's location; there is no community with this name.

References

External links
Page about this airport on COPA's Places to Fly airport directory

Registered aerodromes in Alberta
Transport in the Regional Municipality of Wood Buffalo